Bryan Byrne is an Irish rugby union player for Bristol Bears.

Career

Byrne started playing rugby at the early age of 6 with his local club Carlow RFC. 
He went onto secondary school at Clongowes Wood College. During this time he won the coveted Junior/Senior Cups, and caught the eye of both Leinster and Ireland where he won caps over a 4 year period U17s, U18s, U19s and U20s.
His preferred position is hooker. His senior debut for Leinster was September 2014 against Glasgow Warriors

References
It was announced in April 2015 that he had been awarded a senior contract with Leinster following completion of his time in the academy, having previously played with the Leinster senior team and captained Leinster to two B/I Cups whilst winning a pro 14 In 2018 was part of the victorious Leinster Heineken winning team.

Having initially moved on loan in 2020 to the Bristol Bears he shone, determined to impress in the process he bagged some tries, thereafter signed a permeant contact of that year.

Byrne studied in UCD: has a Bachelor of Science Degree and a Diploma in Project Management from Dublin Business School.

References

External links
Leinster Profile
Pro14 Profile

1993 births
Living people
Rugby union players from County Carlow
Irish rugby union players
Clontarf FC players
Leinster Rugby players
Rugby union hookers